Ilario Cozzi (born April 17, 1959 in Pavia) is a retired Italian professional football player.

1959 births
Living people
Italian footballers
Serie A players
Inter Milan players
Brescia Calcio players
Mantova 1911 players
F.C. Pavia players
U.S. Livorno 1915 players
Association football defenders